Salim Mramboini (born 26 August 1984) is a professional footballer who plays as a defender for Championnat National 3 club Athlético Marseille. Born in France, he is a former Comoros international.

Club career
Mramboini was born in Marseille. In the summer of 2010, he left Championnat de France Amateur club Martigues and joined Marseille Consolat.

Notes

References

External links

1984 births
Living people
Footballers from Marseille
French footballers
Comorian footballers
French sportspeople of Comorian descent
Association football defenders
Comoros international footballers
FC Martigues players
Athlético Marseille players
Championnat National players
Championnat National 2 players
Championnat National 3 players